Estajrud (also Romanized as Estajrūd; also known as Esfahrūd) is a village in Bala Velayat Rural District, Bala Velayat District, Bakharz County, Razavi Khorasan Province, Iran. At the 2006 census, its population was 731, in 147 families.

References 

Populated places in Bakharz County